The 2020 United States House of Representatives elections in New Jersey were held on November 3, 2020, to elect the 12 U.S. representatives from the state of New Jersey, one from each of the state's 12 congressional districts. The primary election in which candidates were chosen took place on July 7, 2020. The general election coincided with the 2020 U.S. presidential election, as well as other elections to the House of Representatives, elections to the United States Senate and various state and local elections.

Overview

District 1

The 1st district is based in South Jersey and encompasses the inner Philadelphia suburbs including parts of Camden County along with parts of Burlington County and Gloucester County. The incumbent is Democrat Donald Norcross, who was re-elected with 64.4% of the vote in 2018.

Democratic primary

Candidates

Declared
Donald Norcross, incumbent U.S. Representative

Primary results

Republican primary

Candidates

Declared
Claire Gustafson, businesswoman and former Collingswood school board member

Withdrawn
Josh Duvall, businessman

Primary results

General election

Predictions

Results

District 2

The 2nd district is anchored in southern New Jersey coast, and includes all of Atlantic, Cumberland, and Salem Counties, and parts of Burlington, Gloucester and Ocean counties. The incumbent is Republican Jeff Van Drew, who was elected in 2018 as a Democrat, flipping the district with 52.9% of the vote. On December 19, 2019, in a meeting with President Donald Trump, Vice President Mike Pence, and House Minority Leader Kevin McCarthy in the Oval Office, Van Drew announced that he officially changed his party affiliation to the Republican Party.

Republican primary

Candidates

Declared
Bob Patterson, former vice president for government relations at the United States Business and Industry Council and nominee for New Jersey's 1st congressional district in 2016
Jeff Van Drew, incumbent U.S. Representative

Withdrawn
Brian T. Fitzherbert, defense contractor, project manager, engineer and former Atlantic County Young Republicans Chairman
David Richter, engineer, lawyer, businessman and former CEO of Hill International (ran in 3rd district instead)

Declined
Chris A. Brown, state senator
DiAnne Gove, state assemblywoman
Seth Grossman, former Atlantic County freeholder and nominee for New Jersey's 2nd congressional district in 2018
Hirsh Singh, engineer, candidate for New Jersey's 2nd congressional district in 2018, and candidate for governor in 2017 (ran for U.S. Senate)

Endorsements

Primary results

Democratic primary

Candidates

Declared
 William Cunningham, chief investigator on the House Oversight Committee and candidate for New Jersey's 2nd congressional district in 2018
John Francis, West Cape May commissioner
Brigid Callahan Harrison, political science professor at Montclair State University
Amy Kennedy, mental health advocate and wife of former U.S. Representative Patrick J. Kennedy
Robert Turkavage, former FBI agent and Republican candidate for New Jersey's 2nd congressional district in 2018

Withdrew
Ashley Bennett, Atlantic County freeholder

Declined
Ray Batten, former New Jersey Superior Court judge
Jack Surrency, Cumberland County freeholder
Adam Taliaferro, state assemblyman

Endorsements

with Jeff Van Drew (D) and Generic Democrat

Primary results

General election

Predictions

Complete Video of Debate

Polling

with Generic Republican and Generic Democrat

with Jeff Van Drew (D) and Generic Opponent

Results

District 3

The 3rd district is based in central New Jersey, and includes parts of Burlington and Ocean Counties.  The incumbent is Democrat Andy Kim, who flipped the district and was elected with 50.0% of the vote in 2018.

Democratic primary

Candidates

Declared
Andy Kim, incumbent U.S. Representative

Endorsements

Primary results

Republican primary

Candidates

Declared
Kate Gibbs, former Burlington County freeholder
David Richter, engineer, lawyer, and former CEO of Hill International

Withdrew
John Novak, mayor of Barnegat (endorsed David Richter)
Tony Porto, former mayor of Hainesport (endorsed David Richter)

Declined
Dawn Addiego, state senator (switched to Democratic Party)
Randy Brown, former mayor of Evesham Township
Sean Earlen, chair of the Burlington County Republican Party (endorsed Kate Gibbs)
Kim Guadagno, former Lieutenant Governor
Jack Kelly, Ocean County freeholder and candidate for New Jersey's 3rd congressional district in 2008 (endorsed David Richter)
Al Leiter, baseball analyst and former Major League Baseball pitcher
Tom MacArthur, former U.S. Representative (endorsed Kate Gibbs)
Gregory P. McGuckin, state Assemblyman (endorsed Kate Gibbs)
Ryan Peters, state Assemblyman (endorsed Kate Gibbs)
Frank Sadeghi, businessman and Republican fundraiser

Endorsements

Primary results

General election

Predictions

Complete Video of Debate

Polling

Results

District 4

The 4th district encompasses parts of Mercer, Monmouth and Ocean Counties  The incumbent is Republican Chris Smith, who was re-elected with 55.4% of the vote in 2018.

Republican primary

Candidates

Declared
Alter Richter, rabbi
Chris Smith, incumbent U.S. Representative

Primary results

Democratic primary

Candidates

Declared
David Applefield, retired journalist
Christine Conforti, holistic life coach and former United Nations staffer
Stephanie Schmid, human rights activist

Withdrew
Tiffany Kaszuba, lobbyist
Jim Keady, former Asbury Park city councilman (2005–2008)
Hassan Shehadeh, financial analyst

Endorsements

Primary results

General election

Predictions

Complete Video of Debate

Endorsements

Results

District 5

The 5th district is based in northern New Jersey, and includes parts of  Bergen County and portions of Passaic , Sussex and Warren Counties. The incumbent is Democrat Josh Gottheimer, who was re-elected with 56.2% of the vote in 2018.

Democratic primary

Candidates

Declared
Josh Gottheimer, incumbent U.S. Representative
Arati Kreibich, Glen Rock borough councilwoman

Endorsements

Polling

Primary results

Republican primary

Candidates

Declared
James Baldini, educator
Hector Castillo
John McCann, former Cresskill borough councilman and nominee for New Jersey's 5th congressional district in 2018
Frank Pallotta, former investment banker

Withdrawn
 Bob Auth, state assemblyman
 Jon Dalrymple Jr., student
 Paul Duggan, candidate for Bergen County Executive in 2018 (running as New Jersey Conservative Party candidate)
 Dana DiRisio, former aide to U.S. Representative Scott Garrett
 Mike Ghassali, mayor of Montvale
John C. Glidden, mayor of Closter

Declined
Michael J. Doherty, state senator
Tim Luing, businessman
Holly Schepisi, state assemblywoman
Parker Space, state assemblyman

Endorsements

Primary results

General election

Predictions

with John McCann

with Mike Ghassali

Results

District 6

The 6th district encompasses northern Middlesex County and parts of Monmouth County, including New Brunswick and Long Branch. The incumbent is Democrat Frank Pallone, who was re-elected with 63.6% of the vote in 2018.

Democratic primary

Candidates

Declared
 Amani al-Khatahtbeh, founder of MuslimGirl.com
 Russ Cirincione, attorney and trade unionist
Frank Pallone, incumbent U.S. Representative

Withdrew
 John Hsu
 Javahn Walker, candidate in 2018

Endorsements

Primary results

Republican primary
Republican candidates Sammy Gindi and Christian Onuoha filed challenges against each other's petitions and as a result both were removed from the primary ballot, however both continued to campaign as write-in candidates in the primary.

Candidates

Declared
 Sammy Gindi, entrepreneur
 Christian Onuoha, candidate for New Jersey General Assembly in 2019

Primary results

General election

Predictions

Results

District 7

The 7th district is based in north-central New Jersey, and includes portions of Morris, Warren, Union, Somerset, Essex and all of Hunterdon County. The incumbent is Democrat Tom Malinowski, who flipped the district and was elected with 51.7% of the vote in 2018.

Democratic primary

Candidates

Declared
Tom Malinowski, incumbent U.S. Representative

Endorsements

Primary results

Republican primary

Candidates

Declared
Raafat Barsoom, physician and candidate for New Jersey's 7th congressional district in 2018
Thomas Kean Jr., minority leader of the New Jersey Senate
Tom Phillips, human resources executive

Withdrawn
Rosemary Becchi, tax attorney and nonprofit executive (running for the 11th congressional district)

Declined
Anthony T. Siniscalco, Conservative Activist, Founder of the West Jersey Statehood movement
Michael J. Doherty, state senator
Matt Holt, Hunterdon County freeholder
Kathy Hugin, philanthropist and former Wall Street bond trader
Leonard Lance, former U.S. Representative
David Larsen, businessman and candidate for New Jersey's 7th congressional district in 2010, 2012, 2014, and 2016
Nancy Munoz, state assemblywoman
Colin Newman, business executive
Erik Peterson, state assemblyman
Jason Sarnoski, Warren County freeholder
Tim Smith, former mayor of Roxbury Township
Doug Steinhardt, chairman of the New Jersey Republican State Committee

Endorsements

Primary results

General election

Debates 
Complete Video of Debate . September 13, 2020

Predictions

Polling

with generic Republican

Results

District 8

The 8th district is based in North Jersey encompassing parts of Bergen, Essex , Hudson and Union Counties. The incumbent is Democrat Albio Sires, who was re-elected with 78.1% of the vote in 2018.

Democratic primary

Candidates

Declared
 Hector Oseguera, lawyer
 Will Sheehan, former U.S. Navy SEAL intelligence officer
Albio Sires, incumbent U.S. Representative

Withdrew
Jonathan Munitz, financial consultant (endorsed Hector Oseguera)

Endorsements

Primary results

Republican primary

Candidates

Declared
 Jason Mushnick, attorney and candidate for New Jersey General Assembly in 2019

Withdrew
 David Winkler

Primary results

General election

Predictions

Results

District 9

The 9th district encompasses parts of Bergen, Passaic and Hudson Counties The incumbent is Democrat Bill Pascrell, who was re-elected with 70.3% of the vote in 2018.

Democratic primary

Candidates

Declared
Alp Basaran, corporate lawyer
Bill Pascrell, incumbent U.S. Representative
Zinovia Spezakis, finance and clean energy executive, environmental activist

Endorsements

Primary results

Republican primary

Candidates

Declared
Billy Prempeh, U.S. Air Force veteran
Tim Walsh, vice chairman of the Bergen County Young Republicans

Primary results

General election

Predictions

Results

District 10

The 10th district encompasses parts of Essex, Hudson and Union Counties The incumbent is Democrat Donald Payne Jr., who was reelected with 87.6% of the vote in 2018.

Democratic primary

Candidates

Declared
John J. Flora, teacher
Eugene Mazo, law professor at Rutgers Law School
Donald Payne Jr., incumbent U.S. Representative

Endorsements

Primary results

Republican primary

Candidates

Declared
Jennifer Zinone, freelance copywriter

Withdrew
Michael W. Barret
Ana Rivera

Primary results

General election

Predictions

Results

District 11

The 11th district includes parts of Morris, Essex, Passaic and Sussex Counties. The incumbent is Democrat Mikie Sherrill, who flipped the district and was elected with 56.8% of the vote in 2018.

Democratic primary

Candidates

Declared
Mikie Sherrill, incumbent U.S. Representative

Withdrew
Mark Washburne, professor

Endorsements

Primary results

Republican primary

Candidates

Declared
Rosemary Becchi, tax attorney and nonprofit executive

Withdrawn
Lawrence Casha, Kinnelon borough councilman
Reinier Prijten, financial manager

Declined
Patrick Alloco, former aide to former Governor Thomas Kean
Mary Pat Christie, former First Lady of New Jersey and former investment banker
James Gannon, Morris County sheriff
Curt Ritter, former mayor of Chatham Township and former press secretary for Rudy Giuliani

Endorsements

Primary results

General election
Complete Video of Debate

Predictions

Results

District 12

The 12th district is located in the Route 1 corridor, encompassing parts of Mercer, Middlesex, Somerset and Union counties. The incumbent is Democrat Bonnie Watson Coleman, who was reelected with 68.7% of the vote in 2018.

Democratic primary

Candidates

Declared
Bonnie Watson Coleman, incumbent U.S. Representative
Lisa McCormick, activist and candidate for U.S. Senate in 2018

Endorsements

Primary results

Republican primary

Candidates

Declared
Mark Razzoli, Old Bridge town councilman

Primary results

General election

Predictions

Results

See also
 2020 New Jersey elections

Notes

Partisan clients

References

Further reading

External links
 
 
  (State affiliate of the U.S. League of Women Voters)
 

Official campaign websites for 1st district candidates
 Claire Gustafson (R) for Congress
 Donald Norcross (D) for Congress

Official campaign websites for 2nd district candidates
 Amy Kennedy (D) for Congress
 Jeff Van Drew (R) for Congress

Official campaign websites for 3rd district candidates
 Andy Kim (D) for Congress
 David Richter (R) for Congress

Official campaign websites for 4th district candidates
 Stephanie Schmid (D) for Congress
 Chris Smith (R) for Congress

Official campaign websites for 5th district candidates
 Josh Gottheimer (D) for Congress
 Frank Pallotta (R) for Congress

Official campaign websites for 6th district candidates
 Christian Onuoha (R) for Congress
 Frank Pallone (D) for Congress

Official campaign websites for 7th district candidates
 Thomas Kean Jr. (R) for Congress
 Tom Malinowski (D) for Congress

Official campaign websites for 8th district candidates
 Albio Sires (D) for Congress

Official campaign websites for 9th district candidates
 Bill Pascrell (D) for Congress
 Billy Prempeh (R) for Congress

Official campaign websites for 10th district candidates
 Donald Payne Jr. (D) for Congress
 Jennifer Zinone (R) for Congress

Official campaign websites for 11th district candidates
 Rosemary Becchi (R) for Congress
 Mikie Sherrill (D) for Congress

Official campaign websites for 12th district candidates
 Mark Razzoli (R) for Congress
 Bonnie Watson Coleman (D) for Congress

2020
New Jersey
United States House of Representatives